The African Historical Review is a biannual peer-reviewed academic journal covering the history of Africa. It was established in 1969 as Kleio: A Journal of Historical Studies from Africa and obtained its current title in 2007. It is published by Routledge in collaboration with UNISA Press. The editors-in-chief are Greg Cuthbertson (University of South Africa), Paul Landau (University of Maryland), Henriëtte Lubbe (University of South Africa), and Russel Viljoen (University of South Africa).

External links 
 

University of South Africa
African history journals
Routledge academic journals
Biannual journals
English-language journals
Publications established in 1969